The Al Kurafi Cup was a Kuwaiti football competition. The competition ran from 1999 to 2007. It was named after M. A. Kharafi & Sons.

Previous winners
1998–99 : Al Arabi Kuwait
1999–2000 : Al Salmiya Club
2000–01 : Al Arabi Kuwait
2001–02 : Al Arabi Kuwait
2002–03 : Al Qadisiya Kuwait 0–0 Al Kazma Kuwait (aet, 6–5 pen)
2003–04 : Al Kazma Kuwait 1–0 Al Arabi Kuwait
2004–05 : Al Kuwait Kaifan 1–1 Al Qadisiya Kuwait (aet, 5–3 pen)
2005–06 : Al Qadisiya Kuwait 2–1 Al Arabi Kuwait
2006–07 : Al Kazma Kuwait 1–0 Al Kuwait Kaifan

Performance By Club

External links
 goalzz.com - Al Kurafi Cup

Kuwaiti football friendly trophies
Defunct football competitions in Kuwait
1999 establishments in Kuwait
2007 disestablishments in Kuwait